Rusty Jones Inc. was an American chemicals company which produced aftermarket rustproofing for vehicles under their "Rusty Jones" trademark. Cars treated with the rustproofing displayed a sticker in the window with the name "Rusty Jones" and a picture of the cartoon character (also named Rusty Jones) from the company's TV commercials. The company was based in Chicago, Illinois.

Formation 
In the 1970s a Chicago company, Body by Thixo-Tex, became successful on a local scale by offering aftermarket rustproofing services to automobile owners. The company engaged an advertising agency, Dawson, Johns & Black, to promote the brand, which they did by creating the Rusty Jones name and character. Company revenue increased fifty-fold within two years, and Rusty Jones became a nationally known service rivaling Ziebart, the previously established leader.  Rusty Jones became a part of Matex Corporation.

Rusty Jones was founded by Michael Mater, originally from Milwaukee, Wisconsin.  He moved to Chicago around 1965 and founded Matex Corporation around 1970. Matex, the parent company of Rusty Jones, was a modified version of Michael's last name, Mater. Mater was born in 1940 and died in 2002 at the age of 62. The name Thixo-Tex was derived from the thixotropic properties of the rustproofing chemical that was applied to the cars. Thixotropic means a viscous fluid that will flow to self-heal small abrasions.   The reason for the change in the product name from Thixo-Tex to Rusty Jones was no one could remember the name "Thixo-Tex". Matex Corporation was a privately held corporation with the corporate headquarters located at 6200 North Hiawatha Ave., Chicago.

Mater sold Rusty Jones to Beatrice Foods family of companies in 1984 with annual sales of $150 million. He stayed on with Beatrice with a five-year contract as president. Beatrice cannibalized most of the company and cut advertising budgets by more than half. The new owners moved advertising away from NASCAR and allowed the company to lose market share.  As the company was failing Beatrice asked Mater if he would buy the company back. He declined due to the damage Beatrice had done to the brand and Beatrice's failure to listen to Mater's protests against the business plan and marketing cuts.

Marketing 
The firm's slogan was Hello Rusty Jones, goodbye rusty cars. In a typical television commercial of 1979, the animated character rode on the roof of a car while saying, "Hi, I’m Rusty Jones, and you know what? I’m the one new car option you can buy that’ll appreciate in value. That’s right, cause I’ll stay with your new car as long as you own it. Winter and summer, day ‘n night, not even a coffee break. Workin' to save your car from rust. And a rust-free car is worth more. So at new car time, insist on Rusty Jones rustproofing."

Bankruptcy 
Rusty Jones Inc. filed for bankruptcy protection in 1988 claiming that automakers' extension of factory warranties against rust had caused business to deteriorate. Between 1985 and 1988, the company's distribution network declined from 3,000 new car dealerships to 1,800. However, there is some disagreement regarding why the company went out of business, as former director of marketing Bruce Freud claimed in an interview that the company was "unbelievably profitable", but that its insurance carrier (who serviced the rust warranties on Rusty Jones treated vehicles) filed for bankruptcy, creating problems for the company.

References 

Defunct manufacturing companies of the United States
Defunct companies based in Chicago
1988 disestablishments in Illinois
American companies disestablished in 1988 
Chemical companies disestablished in 1988
Chemical companies of the United States